This was the first edition of the tournament.

Sergio Gutiérrez Ferrol won the title after defeating Federico Gaio 6–2, 3–6, 6–1 in the final.

Seeds

Draw

Finals

Top half

Bottom half

References
Main Draw
Qualifying Draw

Internazionali di Tennis Country 2001 Team - Singles